Excellence Without A Soul: How a Great University Forgot Education (reissued as Excellence Without a Soul: Does Liberal Education Have a Future?) is a 2006 book by Harry R. Lewis (Gordon McKay Professor of Computer Science at Harvard University's School of Engineering and Applied Sciences) examining the state of American higher education, with particular reference to Harvard. It attracted considerable attention for its trenchant analysis of undergraduate education, much of it based on his experience as dean of Harvard College (19952003).

It has been translated into Chinese and Korean.

References
Poison Ivy: A Harvard man urges the school to redefine its mission, Christopher Shea, The Washington Post, July 2, 2006.
Review by William Gasarch (2007) in ACM SIGACT News 38(1): 9–13, 
 Examining the Crimson's civic slide, Jim Sleeper, The Boston Globe, May 28, 2006.

External links
 Official Website
 Discussion on C-SPAN
 Transcipt of Discussion Reported in The Washington Post

2006 non-fiction books
American non-fiction books
Works about higher education
Works about academia
PublicAffairs books